Eois amydroscia is a moth in the  family Geometridae. It is found in China (Hainan).

References

Moths described in 1922
Eois
Moths of Asia